Hempfield Area School District is a large school district in western Pennsylvania. The school district was formed in a merger of The School District of Hempfield Township, Adamsburg School District, Hunker School District, Manor School District and Youngwood School District on July 3, 1961. The school district population comes from Hempfield Township and the boroughs of Adamsburg, Hunker, Manor, New Stanton, and Youngwood. It completely surrounds the city of Greensburg. The community is a mix of Pittsburgh suburbia and rural areas.
The school system includes five elementary buildings, three middle schools, a high school, an alternative education school and an after-school alternative education program. The Central Westmoreland Career and Technology Center serves Hempfield students in the high school. Hempfield Area School District is made up of approximately 6,600 students in grades K-12, is served by a professional staff of 445, and an administrative staff of 20.

Elementary schools
Fort Allen Elementary School was opened in 1952 and completely renovated in 2000–2001. It is located in central Hempfield Township, Pennsylvania. Upgraded school facilities include an enlarged library with internet access and computerized library catalogue, a 32-station computer lab, full size gym with a stage, well equipped art and music rooms, remolded cafeteria, a nurse's suite, conference room, and modern office space as well as 28 full size classrooms and a number of smaller rooms for specialized instruction. The building has complete climate control. Outside is a large playground.
It was opened in 1952 and was renovated in 2000. Maxwell serves approximately 455 students in kindergarten through fifth grade.
The school was originally opened in 1970 as a junior high school. Due to declining enrollment, Hempfield did not have a need for four junior high schools. In 1984, New Stanton Elementary and Youngwood Elementary were closed and Stanwood was turned into an elementary school. Stanwood serves approximately 628 students in grades Kindergarten through fifth. The school's cadre of teachers and support staff numbers approximately 60. The school was completely renovated in 2009–2010.
West Hempfield Elementary School is located in Irwin, Pennsylvania. West Hempfield Elementary School was opened in 1962 and completely renovated in 2002–2003. This school serves approximately 615 students in grades Kindergarten through fifth.
West Point Elementary School is located off of Route 130 in eastern Hempfield Township, Pennsylvania. West Point Elementary School, which was opened in 1964 and renovated in 2001. West Point serves approximately 250 students from eastern Hempfield Township in grades Kindergarten through fifth. Starting in the 2007–08 school year, students that attended East Hempfield Elementary will now attend here.

Middle schools
Harrold Middle School is located directly across from the Hempfield Area High School in the central part of Hempfield Township, Pennsylvania. It is the largest of the three Hempfield Area Middle Schools. It is also the oldest school in the district. It was opened in 1929 and has been renovated extensively in 1985 and in 2000.                                     

Wendover Middle School is located in the eastern part of Hempfield Township, Pennsylvania. The school was opened in 1970 and is due to be renovated in the next few years. Students participate in a variety of district, regional, state, and national academic and athletic competitions. The students win numerous awards and championships annually. 

West Hempfield Middle School is located in Irwin, Pennsylvania. It was opened in 1964 and was completely renovated and updated for the start of the 2003–2004 school year. Students participate in a variety of district, regional, state, and national academic and athletic competitions. The students win numerous awards and championships annually. West Hempfield Middle serves students in the western and now southern part of Hempfield Township.

High school
Hempfield Area High School

Vocational technical services
HAHS uses the services of Central Westmoreland Career and Technology Center in New Stanton for the students there who wish to choose a vocational or technical program.

Former schools
East Hempfield Elementary School (1958–2007) was a primary school located in eastern Hempfield Township, Pennsylvania. Originally, East Hempfield served approximately 200 students in grades 1–6. Later, it served students in K-2. After students finished second grade, they would attend West Point Elementary School. The school was built in 1958.
Bovard Elementary School (1)
Bovard Elementary School (2) (1975–2013) is located in the northeastern section of Hempfield Township, Pennsylvania. Bovard serves approximately 240 students in grades Kindergarten through fifth. The school was opened in 1975, making it the last school built in the district.
St. Clair Elementary School (1)
St. Clair Elementary School (2) (1954–1990)
Youngwood Elementary School (-1983)
Youngwood Junior High School
New Stanton Elementary School (-1983)
Thomas Elementary School (-1983)
Manor Elementary School (1901–1990)
Manor Junior High School
Lincoln Heights Elementary School (-1982)
Luxor Elementary School
Mt. Odin Elementary School
Todd Elementary School
Diamond Elementary School
Pleasant Valley Elementary School
Brush Creek Elementary School
Grapeville Elementary School
Washington Elementary School
Hannastown Elementary School
Liberty Elementary School
Kamerer Elementary School
Weavers Old Stand Elementary School
Kennedy Elementary School
Armburst Elementary School
Hillview Elementary School
Blank Elementary School
High Park Elementary School
Oak Grove Elementary School
Swede Hill Elementary School
Stanton Elementary School
Wendel Elementary School
Paintersville Elementary School
Hunker Elementary School
Harrold #8 (1881–1928) Restored and now used by the district as an educational tool.

Former superintendents
 Dr. Barbara Marin (2014–2017)
 Andy Leopold (2011–2014)
 Dr. Terry Foriska (2007–2011)
 Dr. Wayne Doyle (2000–2007)
 Dr. Erv Weischedel (1999–2000)
 Dr. Barbara Ferrier (1998–1999) (Acting)
 Dr. Cheryl Troglio (1997–1998) (Acting)
 Dr. C. Richard Nichols (1991–1997)
 Dr. Silvio Mincucci (1991) (Acting)
 Dr. Margaret Smith (1986–1991)
 William Roscher (1986) (Acting)
 Dr. Elliott LeFavier (1983–1986)
 Kenneth Ruoff (1969–1982)
 Theo Fullerton (1952–1969)

Extracurriculars
The district offers a variety of clubs, activities and sports.

Athletics
Hempfield Area Spartans Baseball
Hempfield Area Spartans Basketball – 6–16
Hempfield Area Spartans Bowling
Hempfield Area Spartans Cross Country
Hempfield Area Spartans Field Hockey
Hempfield Area Spartans Football – 1–8
Hempfield Area Spartans Golf
Hempfield Area Spartans Rifle
Hempfield Area Spartans Soccer
Hempfield Area Spartans Softball
Hempfield Area Spartans Swimming
Hempfield Area Spartans Tennis –
Section champions 2003, 2004, 2005, 2010, 2011; 
Hempfield Area Spartans Track and Field
Hempfield Area Spartans Volleyball – Logan Karanovich (captain)
Hempfield Area Spartans Wrestling
Hempfield Area Spartans Competitive Majorettes and Color Guard
Hempfield Area Spartans Competitive Cheer

References

External links
  http://hasdpa.net/ – HASD Main Page

School districts established in 1961
School districts in Westmoreland County, Pennsylvania
Education in Pittsburgh area